Darren Barber (born 26 December 1968 in Victoria, British Columbia) is a Canadian competition rower and Olympic champion. He is a graduate of Brentwood College School in Mill Bay, British Columbia.

Barber won a gold medal in coxed eights at the 1992 Summer Olympics in Barcelona, as a member of the Canadian team. He also competed at the 1996 Summer Olympics in Atlanta, where he finished 4th. In 2014, he coached the women's novice team at Trent University in Peterborough, Ontario.

Personal
His grandfather was former Toronto Maple Leafs hockey captain Syl Apps. His uncle was Syl Apps Jr., and his cousin Gillian Apps won gold medals with the Canadian Olympic women's ice hockey teams in 2006 and 2010.

References

1968 births
Canadian male rowers
Olympic rowers of Canada
Rowers at the 1992 Summer Olympics
Rowers at the 1996 Summer Olympics
Olympic gold medalists for Canada
Rowers from Victoria, British Columbia
Living people
Olympic medalists in rowing
Medalists at the 1992 Summer Olympics